Edward Palanker is an American clarinetist and university professor.

Education
Mr. Palanker graduated from The Manhattan School of Music and attended the Mannes College of Music. His principal clarinet teachers where Leon Russianoff and Eric Simon and he studied bass clarinet with Joe Allard. Other instructors included Earl Bates, Robert Marcellus, Anthony Gigliotti and Bernard Portnoy.

Performance career
Mr. Palanker performed in over two hundred concerts as the Principal Clarinetist of The Eastern Music Festival Philharmonic in Greensboro, North Carolina for 25 years, where he also performed all of the standard clarinet concertos and chamber music repertoire. He was the clarinetist and bass clarinetist with the Baltimore Symphony Orchestra Retired in 2014. He also performed regularly on the Music by Candlelight Series, the BSO Chamber Music series, and was the principal clarinetist with the Choral Arts Society of Baltimore.
Previously, he was a member of the Atlantic Symphony Orchestra in Halifax, Nova Scotia, The Kinhaven Music Festival in Vermont, and The Theater Chamber Players in Washington, D.C.
Mr. Palanker has recorded the complete solo clarinet works of Theldon Myers as well as other solo and ensemble music in the 70s and 80s. He has performed on many of the BSO recordings.

Teaching career

From 1967 to 2000 Palanker taught at Towson University, where he was in charge of the clarinet department, woodwind ensembles and director of the Towson Chamber Players. Upon his retirement, he was awarded the honor of Professor Emeritus  for his outstanding service to the music department and the  University.

From 1992 to 2010 he was also on the faculty of  The Peabody Conservatory of Music, where he performed regularly on the chamber music series.

He also taught at several music festivals.
 
As a member of The Towson Fine Arts Wind Quintet, he performed concerts and master classes at the St. Petersburg Conservatory in Russia. He also presented a master class at the Manhattan School of Music as part of its “Visiting Orchestra Series,” performances and classes at ClarinetFests at the University of Ohio and University of Maryland, and the Oklahoma Symposium.

Many of his former students are performing in major orchestras and military bands throughout the United States, including the Philadelphia Orchestra.

Publications
Mr. Palanker is also a frequent guest writer for The Clarinet Journal, published by the International Clarinet Association.

Affiliations

Palanker is a Selmer bass clarinet-performing artist and a Rico Grand Concert Reed artist

External links
Official website
Clarinet Cache
Biography at Conn-Selmer's website
Biography at Baltimore Symphony Orchestra's website

Living people
Year of birth missing (living people)
American classical clarinetists
Manhattan School of Music alumni
Towson University faculty
Peabody Institute faculty
21st-century clarinetists